The Neighbors is an American game show. It aired on ABC from December 29, 1975 to April 9, 1976. It included five female neighbors as contestants, who were asked gossip questions about each other.  Regis Philbin co-hosted the show with Jane Nelson, and Joe Seiter was the announcer.  It was produced by Bill Carruthers.

Gameplay
Two female neighbors competed for cash by answering questions about a panel of three of their neighbors. Philbin read a statement about one of the two contestants and the contestants must guess which contestant most of the panel felt that question applied to. Correct answers scored $25.

In round 2, the contestants must guess which panelist made a particular statement about that player. A correct selection scored $50 while the selected panelist earned $25 whether correct or not.

In round 3, a statement would be read about one of the two contestants, made as a unanimous opinion by all three panelists. The first player to buzz in and choose the correct neighbor earned money. Choosing the wrong neighbor won the opposing neighbor the money.  The first question scored $50, the second question was worth $100, $150 for the third, $200 for the fourth, and $300 for the fifth question. After the fifth question, the player with the most money won a bonus prize.

Episode status
The tapes of Neighbors episodes are believed to have been destroyed, though a clip surfaced on a 2000 E! True Hollywood Story profile of big money game shows (including Who Wants to Be a Millionaire?, which Regis Philbin hosted at the time). At least three episodes are known to exist and are in the hands of private collectors. On August 7, 2013, an episode of the show was uploaded on YouTube. The pilot episode also exists, featuring an opening song different from one used for the rest of the series. On February 6, 2015, another episode of The Neighbors was uploaded to YouTube. The episode in question was recorded from its original airing by a viewer of KABC-TV and aired sometime in March 1976, but is missing its intro. This same episode is available for viewing at the Paley Center for Media.

References

External links
The Neighbors at the Internet Movie Database

1975 American television series debuts
1976 American television series endings
American Broadcasting Company original programming
1970s American game shows
English-language television shows
Television series by Warner Bros. Television Studios